WI Sports is a local sports channel that broadcasts on channel 14 on the Flow Trinidad cable system serving Trinidad. It is a cable only channel dedicated to airing  local and regional sporting events, leagues, news highlights and live feeds of games. Its headquarters are located at Ground Floor, Nicholas Towers, Independence Square, Port of Spain.

History

On 1 April 2010, WI Sports replaced Tempo TV due to low viewership. On Sunday 1 April 2012, Tempo TV returned to Flow's channel lineup.

Network Slogans
 Bringing local sports to your homes. (2011–present)

References

External links
 Live Stream
WI Sports Press Release
 Flow Trinidad

Television stations in Trinidad and Tobago
Television channels and stations established in 2010